The Latécoère 521 was a French six-engined double deck flying boat designed and manufactured by Pierre-Georges Latécoère. At the time of its completion, it held the distinction of being the largest aircraft to be built in France as well as one of the first large passenger aircraft capable of flying trans-Atlantic routes.

First flown on 10 January 1935, the Laté 521 achieved several world records relating to payload and endurance. It was introduced to passenger service by national operator Air France, who was able to launch several previously-unattainable long distance passenger routes. As a civilian aircraft, the Laté 521 was outfitted as a luxurious airliner, providing a high level of comfort for up to 72 passengers. Shortly after the outbreak of the Second World War, the Laté 521 were taken over by the French Navy, who typically operated the type as a long distance maritime patrol aircraft. None survived the conflict due to sabotage by the retreating German forces. The Laté 521 was the basis of the single Laté 522 "Ville de Saint Pierre" civil airliner, and the three Laté 523 navalized variants.

Design and development
During the early 1930s, French aircraft manufacturer Groupe Latécoère set about designing a new large flying boat, which was intended to perform long range flights, carrying both passengers and air mail. Around this era, France, Germany, the United Kingdom, the Soviet Union, and the United States, were endeavouring to launch ever-larger aircraft that would exceed the scale and payload capabilities of preceding aircraft and ultimately displace the ocean liner as the principal means of passenger travel. The development of such aircraft was a matter of national prestige and Latécoère quickly found support for their endeavour.

The design, designated the Laté 520, was a large sesquiplane, comprising a central double-decked hull and a pair of stub wings, somewhat resembling the smaller Latécoère 300. Weighing roughly  loaded and  empty, it was the largest aircraft to be manufactured by French industry at that time. It was named Lieutenant de vaisseau Paris, after an accomplished French naval officer and record-breaking pilot of the era.

The Laté 520 featured a large double-decked hull that provided room for 80 passengers. It featured an all-metal structure, largely composed of duralumin. The hull used a longitudinal construction approach, dissipating stress from the skin across its transverse frames. As a measure to mitigate against potential damage, the hull was divided into seven water-tight compartments. The stub-wings, hinged to the bottom of the hull, each carried a sponson to provide additional stability upon the water, as well as housing large fuel tanks and featuring an airfoil section to assist during takeoff runs. A large number of stiffeners were present throughout the stub-wings to achieve a relatively stress-resistant construction, conveying and distributing stresses across the frames and hull spars.

The wing of the Laté 520 comprised a centre section and two fabric-covered outer sections, these being braced to the stub wings. This wing used a conventional two-spar design, both the box spars and ribs being made of duralumin. The structure of the wing was internally braced by a combination of duralumin tubular tie rods and round high-tensile steel tubing. The rounded wing tips were supported by lattice-form spars. The statically-balanced ailerons were divided into three sections, the central ailerons using lattice-form spars while the outer ailerons had spars composed of round tubing; externally, the ailerons had fabric coverings. The wing was braced on either side by four inclined v-struts; these bracing struts were faired with shaped duralumin sheeting, internally held by compact flat plates and U-sections.

In its civilian service configuration, the Laté 521 would transport a maximum of 72 passengers in luxurious conditions. However, typical trans-Atlantic services would normally only carry around 26 passengers, all of which would be upon the lower deck. Larger passenger complements could be carried on the shorter trans-Mediterranean routes for which the design had originally been envisioned to serve. On the lower level, there was a salon occupied by 20 armchairs and tables, along with six deluxe double cabins, each with its own bathroom, and seating for a further 22 passengers, a kitchen, a bar, a lavatory, and a baggage hold. Separate compartments for the wireless operator and navigator are also present on the lower deck. The more compact and narrower upper level of the hull featured seating for 18 passengers, along with a storage compartment, a second kitchen and bar, and another lavatory. The forward section of the upper deck is also where the two flying officers and the commanding officer would be seated. Directly behind the pilots is where the aircraft's flight engineers would be stationed, these engineers could directly access all six engines in-flight via compact walkways housed inside of the wings.

Originally, the Laté 521 was intended to be powered by an arrangement of four  Hispano-Suiza 18Sbr W-18 engines, derived from an existing air racing engine; however, these engines would ultimately never become available. This change involved considerable redesign work and delayed the project's completion. Controlling these engines posed several difficulties; thus the throttles for the six engines use an integral design involving declutchable tips and stirrups, which eased control difficulties and enhancing the aircraft's maneuverability on the water as well.

Operational history
On 10 January 1935, the first Laté 521 performed the type's first flight. Following a number of test flights, a highly-publicised demonstration flight was conducted in December 1935, flying via Dakar to Natal, Brazil, before turning north towards the French West Indies. This long distance flight was timed to deliberately coincide with the 300th year of French rule in the Americas. However, tragedy struck when, shortly after having successfully reached Pensacola, Florida, the aircraft was caught in a hurricane and wrecked. The aircraft was salvaged and returned to France by ship, where it was rebuilt for regular service with flag carrier Air France on the trans-Atlantic routes. Prior to Air France's adoption of the Laté 521, the airline had only been able to carry air mail along some of its long distance routes, and thus had enabled new passenger services to be launched for the first time.

During June 1937, the Laté 521 flew non-stop to Natal before returning to France via the North Atlantic. (The FAI Bulletin says it had six  engines at the time.) Having been equipped with more powerful engines, the Laté 521 conducted a further four return flights to New York between May and July 1939.

On the outbreak of the Second World War, the Laté 521 was pressed into service with the French Navy, all aircraft were attached to the flotilla E.6, based in Port-Lyautey, Morocco, where they performed maritime patrol flights over the North Atlantic. After the Armistice of 22 June 1940 between France and Nazi Germany, the aircraft was flown to Berre, near Marseille. The Laté 521 remained at Berre intact up until August 1944 when, following the launch of Operation Dragoon by the Allies to liberate southern France, the aircraft was deliberately destroyed by the retreating German occupying forces.

Variants
Data from:
520The initial design of the 520 series, powered by 4 ×  Hispano-Suiza 18Sbr W-18 engines in tandem pairs.
521 Lieutenant de Vaisseau Paris The first completed aircraft, powered by 6 × Hispano-Suiza 12Ydrs. Operated by Air France on route proving flights the 521 was militarised in 1939 and operated by the Vichy government until stored at Marignane, finally being destroyed when Axis troops retreated from advancing Allies.
522 Ville de Saint Pierre The second aircraft of the 520 series, powered by 6 × Hispano-Suiza 12Y-37 engines, had a brief civilian career before being militarised similar to the 521. Operated by the Ministre des Colonies de Vichy, the 522 met a similar fate to the 521, being destroyed by retreating enemy troops in 1944.
523 Three armed maritime patrol aircraft named l'Algol, l'Aldébaran and l'Altair, operated by Vichy French forces.
524 Projected variant of the 521 to have been powered by 8 × CLM Lille 6As opposed-piston 2-stroke diesel engines.
525 Similar to the 524 but powered by 8 x Hispano-Suiza 12Y engines.

Operators

 Air France
 Aviation Navale

Specifications (Laté 521)

See also

References

Citations

Bibliography

 "The Latecoere 521 "Lieutenant De Vaisseau Paris" commercial flying boat (French) : a two-deck six-engine semicantilever sesquiplane." National Advisory Committee for Aeronautics, 1 March 1935. NACA-AC-202, 93R19807.

External links 

 Latécoère 521 film
 Popular Mechanics, December 1935 article on Air France with page on the 521

1930s French airliners
1930s French civil aircraft
521
Flying boats
Six-engined push-pull aircraft
Parasol-wing aircraft
Aircraft first flown in 1935